Crowne Plaza is a British multinational chain of full service, upscale hotels headquartered in the United Kingdom. It caters to business travelers and the meetings and conventions market. It forms part of the InterContinental Hotels Group family of brands, which include InterContinental Hotels & Resorts and Holiday Inn Hotels & Resorts, and operates in nearly 100 countries with more than 431 hotels and 118,000 bedrooms, usually located in city centers, resorts, coastal towns or near major airports.

History

Holiday Inn Crowne Plaza was established in 1983 as the upscale division of Holiday Inn. The first Holiday Inn Crowne Plaza hotel opened that year in Rockville, Maryland. In 1988, Bass PLC (today InterContinental Hotels Group) purchased Holiday Corporation and in 1994 the brand was renamed Crowne Plaza Hotels. In 1999, Crowne Plaza opened its first European property, in Madeira, Portugal.

Notable properties
 The Crowne Plaza Liverpool John Lennon Airport is the former terminal building of Liverpool Speke Airport, constructed in the 1930s and used until 1986. Its notable art deco features led to its listing as a heritage building, and subsequent conversion to a hotel.
 The Crowne Plaza Copenhagen Towers is the first hotel in Denmark to generate all of its power from renewable sources, including solar panels and geothermal heating and cooling pumps. Its stationary bicycles are connected to generators, which provide electricity to the hotel.
 Crowne Plaza Belgrade, renovated 2012–13, is the biggest Crowne Plaza hotel in Europe.
 The Hotel International Prague was branded as a Crowne Plaza for several years until its sale in 2014.

Sponsorship
Crowne Plaza Hotels & Resorts is the title sponsor of the Crowne Plaza Invitational at Colonial - a PGA Tour golf tournament held annually in Fort Worth, Texas. Starting in 2012, they are also officially sponsoring PGA Tour's 2010's Rookie of the Year, Rickie Fowler.

Crowne Plaza Hotels & Resorts have been the sponsor of the British FIA World Touring Car Championship driver Andy Priaulx, a multiple touring car champion, since 2006. They now continue to support him in the Deutsche Tourenwagen Masters (DTM), a popular European touring car championship, as an official sponsor of BMW Motorsport along with the American LeMans Series (ALMS) where Californian Joey Hand represents the brand for both series.

Gallery

References 

1983 establishments in Maryland
Hotels established in 1983
InterContinental Hotels Group brands